Kerala Janapaksham (Secular) is a registered political party in Kerala. It was founded by P. C. George in 2019. It had an MLA from the Poonjar constituency.

History
Kerala Janapaksham (Secular) formed after PC george expelled from his party AKA Kerala Congress (Secular) by his followers.

History Of Kerala Congress (Secular)

Kerala Congress (Secular) fraction formed after the split from Kerala Congress (Joseph) On early 2000's . main and leader of the fraction was P.C George however party chairman was T.S. John. P C George was MLA From poonjar. Kerala Congress (Secular) was part of LDF then . however he expelled from LDF and forced to join UDF . Kerala Congress (Secular) became part of UDF by  mergered into Kerala Congress (Mani) on 2010. and Pc George became vice chairman of Kerala Congress (Mani) .

P.C George Expelled and he created Kerala Janapaksham and fate of other members 
After the Revival of Kerala Congress (Secular) no one in the Kerala politics want to work with P.C George. So George Was expelled from Kerala Congress (Secular) which ultimately  created many factions in the party  and they all tried to merge with other parties. and George created Kerala Janapaksham (Secular)

First Faction 
First group was led by TS John , he  announced its decision to rejoin with  Kerala Congress (Mani) however, a section of the party led by Kallada Das, PA Alexander, A. A. Abraham decided to retain the party.

Second Faction 
Second group  of leaders led by PA Alexander and A. A. Abraham, announced its decision to merge with the Nationalist Congress Party (NCP).

Third Faction 
Third faction led by Deacon Thomas Kayyathra merged with Kerala Congress (Skaria Thomas) group

Fourth Faction 
Fourth faction led by Kallada Das decided to retain the party and join the National Democratic Alliance. Later this faction merged with Kerala Congress (Thomas).
In 2018, Kerala Congress (Secular) Kalalda Das faction merged with Kerala Congress.

2016 Kerala Legislative Assembly election - 2021 Kerala Legislative Assembly election

On 2016 Kerala Legislative Assembly election PC George contested from Poonjar constituency as independent candidate and defeated all 3 fronts.
Later he tried an alliance with BJP Led NDA and UDf however didn't successful on 2021 Kerala Legislative Assembly election he lost from  poonjar constituency.

References

Former member parties of the National Democratic Alliance
Political parties in Kerala
Political parties established in 2019
2019 establishments in Kerala